Big Time is a 1988 American musical film directed by Chris Blum.

Summary
A concert film centering on singer Tom Waits featuring songs from the albums Swordfishtrombones, Rain Dogs and Franks Wild Years.

Production
Filming took place in Los Angeles and San Francisco, California.

There were no known existing 35mm prints of this concert film until an archival one appeared in the late 2010s.

Cast
 Tom Waits - Himself
 Michael L. Blair - Musician
 Ralph Carney - Musician
 Greg Cohen - Musician
 Marc Ribot - Musician
 Willie Schwarz - Musician

Songs
 "Frank's Wild Years"
 "Shore Leave"
 "Way Down in the Hole"
 "Hang On St. Christopher"
 "Telephone Call From Istanbul"
 "Cold, Cold Ground"
 "Straight to the Top (Vegas)"
 "Strange Weather"
 "Gun Street Girl"
 "9th and Hennepin"
 "Clap Hands"
 "Time"
 "Rain Dogs"
 "Train Song"
 "Sixteen Shells From a Thirty-Ought Six"
 "I'll Take New York"
 "More Than Rain"
 "Johnsburg, Illinois"
 "Innocent When You Dream (Barroom)"
 "Big Black Mariah"

Critical response
Jon Pareles wrote a negative review in The New York Times, saying even fans of Waits would find it "frustrating and off-putting" and that it "turns Mr. Waits's performance into a freak show." Richard Harrington wrote a negative review in The Washington Post, describing the film as "More an indulgence than a concert" and the songs as "often intriguing" but "only rarely [...] listenable". Jeffrey M. Anderson, in a mixed review for Combustible Celluloid, described the film as "a treat" for fans of Tom Waits and "one hell of a show." Time Out magazine called it a "magnificent movie" and "A concert film unlike any other". TV Guide gave the film 3 out of 5 stars, calling it "more performance than music" and a "work that demands to be taken on its own terms."

Formats
Big Time was issued on LaserDisc, VHS in Japan, UK and Yugoslavia, but was only issued on VHS in North America. No official DVD or Blu-ray edition has yet been released yet it was made available for streaming on the Amazon Prime platform on September 1, 2020.

See also
Home of the Brave - Laurie Anderson 1986 concert film
Stop Making Sense
Jim Jarmusch

References

External links
 Big Time on IMDb
 Excerpt on artist's official YouTube channel

Concert films
1980s musical films
Tom Waits
1980s rediscovered films
Rediscovered American films
1980s English-language films